Matir Pahar is a 1959 Bengali film. The film was directed by Mohiuddin Ahmad. This was the third film made in East Pakistan (now Bangladesh).

Cast
 Sumita Devi
 Khan Ataur Rahman
 Mesbah Shahjahan

Response 
Film critic Ahmed Muztaba Zamal, when asked in 2000 by the magazine Cinemaya to name the top ten films from Bangladesh, named Matir Pahar, made when the country was still East Pakistan, as one of the top twelve.

According to critic Alamgir Kabir, Matir Pahar "failed miserably" at the box office, unable to compete with films made in India and Lahore with established stars.

References

External links
 

1959 films
1959 drama films
Bengali-language Pakistani films
Bangladeshi drama films
1950s Bengali-language films